The Angola women's national handball team Under-17 represents Angola in international handball competitions and is controlled by the Federação Angolana de Andebol. At continental level, it competes at the African Women's Youth Handball Championship which qualifies for the IHF Women's Youth World Championship. Angola has been a member of the IHF since 1979.

Youth Olympic Games record

World Championship record

African Women's Championship record

Current squad
The following is the roster for the 2018 World Championship held in Kielce, Poland from 7–19 August 2018.

Technical team
 José Chuma – Head coach
 Danilo Júnior – Assistant coach
 Imaculada Vilola – Physio
 Janina Sousa – Manager

Players

2011–2018
A = African championship; = African championship winner;W = World cup;O = Olympic tournament

2006–2010
AC = African championship; = African championship winner;WC = World cup;OT = Olympic tournament

Head coach positions
  José Chuma – 2018
  Luís Chaves – 2017
  Alfredo Alvarez – 2016
  Luís Chaves – 2014, 2015
  Quinteiro Teresa – 2013
  Alex Fernandes – 2010, 2011, 2012
  João Ricardo – 2008, 2009

See also
 Angola women's national handball team
 Angola women's junior national handball team
 Angola women's youth basketball team

References

External links
 Team roster 2012 Youth World Championship

Women's national youth handball teams
Youth national team
Handball
Youth sport in Angola